Ihor Zhabchenko (born 1 July 1968) is a Ukrainian professional football coach and a former player.

Playing career
He made his professional debut in the Soviet Second League in 1989 for FC Dynamo Bila Tserkva. He played 7 games in the 1996 UEFA Intertoto Cup for FC Rotor Volgograd.

Coaching career
Since 2013 till 2016, he was a manager of Hirnyk-Sport Komsomolsk.

Honours
 Ukrainian Premier League runner-up: 1996.
 Russian Premier League bronze: 1996.

References

External links
 

1968 births
Living people
Footballers from Kyiv
Soviet footballers
Ukrainian footballers
Ukraine international footballers
Ukrainian Premier League players
Ukrainian First League players
Ukrainian Second League players
Ukrainian Amateur Football Championship players
Russian Premier League players
FC Zenit Saint Petersburg players
FC Sula Lubny players
FC Kremin Kremenchuk players
FC Systema-Boreks Borodianka players
FC Ros Bila Tserkva players
FC Chornomorets Odesa players
Bnei Yehuda Tel Aviv F.C. players
Ukrainian expatriate footballers
Expatriate footballers in Israel
Expatriate footballers in Russia
Ukrainian expatriate sportspeople in Israel
Ukrainian expatriate sportspeople in Russia
FC Rotor Volgograd players
FC Shakhtar Donetsk players
MFC Mykolaiv players
FC Metalurh Donetsk players
FC Yenisey Krasnoyarsk players
Ukrainian football managers
FC Zirka Kropyvnytskyi managers
PFC Sumy managers
FC Hirnyk-Sport Horishni Plavni managers
Association football midfielders
Association football defenders